Qaraqullar (also, Karagullar, Karakollar, and Karakullar) is a village and municipality in the Dashkasan Rayon of Azerbaijan.  It has a population of 796.  The municipality consists of the villages of Qaraqullar, Qaratağlar, and Şahkərəm.

References 

Populated places in Dashkasan District